Battleground is Africa Magic telenovela Nigeria series starring Joke Silva, Shaffy Bello, Yinka Davies, Ini Dima-Okojie, Ozzy Agu, Nonso Bassey, Chike, Hauwa Alhbura, Gbenga Titiloye, Francis Onwuche, and Okey Uzoeshi. In its final season, Waje was recurred to join the cast.

Synopsis
They might be exceptionally wealthy and powerful but the Badmus family’s love for one another is put to the test when an unfortunate series of events leads to greed and power struggles within their ranks. It’s a classic tale of love and war that’s sure to be a thrilling watch.

Cast

Main Cast
Joke Silva as Mama Egba
Shaffy Bello as Adaora Badmus
Yinka Davies as Cissy Jack Badmus
Ini Dima-Okojie as Teni Badmus
Hauwa Alhbura as Ayo Badmus
Gbenga Titiloye as Kolade Badmus
Chike as Mayowa Badmus
Ozzy Agu as Michael Ige Williams
Francis Onwuche as Peter Ige Williams
Nonso Bassey as Dr. Emeka Kalu
Okey Uzoeshi as Ola Badmus

Recurring
Waje

Writers
Ayoade Adeyanju (2017-2018) - (unknown episodes)
Lani Aisida (2017-2018) - (unknown episodes)
Pearl Osibu (2017-2018) - (unknown episodes)
Bode Asiyanbi (2018) - (unknown episodes)

Directors
Mike-Steve Adeleye - (unknown episodes)
Sampson Afolabi-Johnson - (unknown episodes)
George Sunom Kura - (unknown episodes)
Yemi Morafa - (Episode 100)
Uduak-Obong Patrick - (unknown episodes)

Episodes

Season 1 (2017)

Season 2 (2018)

Broadcast history
The film premiered on Showmax on 9 December 2020.

References

External links
 Battleground at Africa Magic
 Battleground at Showmax
 

Africa Magic original programming
2017 Nigerian television series debuts
2020 Nigerian television series endings
2017 telenovelas